This is a list of steamboats on the Yukon River.  Please see Steamboats of the Yukon River for historical context.

White Pass & Yukon Route vessels
{| class="wikitable"
|+White Pass Steam Power – Stern Wheel Boats (83 vessels)
|- style="vertical-align:bottom"
! Name
! Registry (-ies)
! Year Built
! Where Built
! Builder
! Volume (gross tons)
! Hull Length
! Remarks

|- style="vertical-align:top; text-align:center"
|style="text-align:left"|Aksala
(Alaska, 1913–1927)
|U.S.A. #165171 (1913–1927);
Canada #116621 (1927–1964)
|1913
|Seattle, Washington (hull);
Whitehorse, Yukon (superstructure)
|Nilson & Kelez Shipbuilding Corp. (hull);
WP&YR (superstructure)
|1067
(785, 1913–1927)
|167 feet
|style="text-align:left"|Last used in 1951. Broken up at Whitehorse in 1964.  Aksala is Alaska spelled backwards.
- Alaska was derived from the Aleut idiom , which figuratively refers to mainland Alaska.  Literally, it means object to which the action of the sea is directed.

|- style="vertical-align:top; text-align:center"
|style="text-align:left"|Alaska
|......
|......
|......
|......
|......
|......
|style="text-align:left"|See, Aksala.

|- style="vertical-align:top; text-align:center"
|style="text-align:left"|Alice (of Kuskokwim)
|U.S.A. #107253
|1895
|St. Michael, Alaska
|Alaska Commercial Co.
|400
|160 feet
|style="text-align:left"|Originally owned by Alaska Commercial Co. Transferred to Northern Navigation Co. in 1901. Acquired by WP&YR in 1914. Not used under WP&YR ownership. Abandoned at St. Marys, Alaska in 1917.
- Named for Alice Levison (1873–1973), daughter of AC Co. president Lewis Gerstle.

|- style="vertical-align:top; text-align:center"
|style="text-align:left"|Alice (of Susitna)
|U.S.A. #260095
|1909
|Seattle, Washington
|Cook & Lake Shipyards
|262
|111 feet
|style="text-align:left"|Originally owned by Alaska Commercial Co.  Sold to Northern Navigation Co. in 1911. Acquired by WP&YR in 1914. Last used by WP&YR in 1917. Sold to The Alaska R.R. in 1926. Retired and resold to the Catholic Church (Holy Cross Mission) in 1953.

|- style="vertical-align:top; text-align:center"
|style="text-align:left"|Anglian
|Canada #107512
|1898
|Teslin, Yukon
|Teslin & Yukon Transportation Co.
|162
|85 feet
|style="text-align:left"|Originally owned by the Canadian Development Co.  The T&YT had intended to build the boat for its own use, but the CD Co. bought out the T&YT in February 1898, before the boat was built.  Boat acquired by WP&YR in 1901. Last used by WP&YR in 1901. Broken up at Whitehorse, Yukon in 1931.
- Named for Henry Maitland Kersey (1859–1941), managing director of the CD Co.  Kersey was from Suffolk, in East Anglia, England.

|- style="vertical-align:top; text-align:center"
|style="text-align:left"|Arnold
|U.S.A. #107353
|1898
|Dutch Harbor, Alaska
|Thomas P. H. Whitelaw
|692
|181 feet
|style="text-align:left"|Originally owned by Alaska Exploration Co. Transferred to Northern Navigation Co. in 1901. Acquired by WP&YR in 1914. Not used under WP&YR ownership. Abandoned across the bay from St. Michael, Alaska in 1917.
- Named for Arnold L. Liebes (1889–1957), son of AE Co. president Isaac Liebes.

|- style="vertical-align:top; text-align:center"
|style="text-align:left"|Australian
|Canada #107525
|1899
|Bennett, British Columbia
|Canadian Development Co.
|422
|115 feet
|style="text-align:left"|Originally owned by CD Co. Acquired by WP&YR in 1901. Last used by WP&YR in 1904. Sold to U.S. Public Roads Administration and converted to Barge #1450 in 1942. Transferred back to WP&YR in 1943. Scuttled at Carcross, Yukon about 1970.
- Most likely, named for the Victoria, Australia gold rush of 1851.

|- style="vertical-align:top; text-align:center"
|style="text-align:left"|Bella
|U.S.A. #3759
|1896
|St. Michael, Alaska
|Matthew Turner
|370
|140 feet
|style="text-align:left"|Originally owned by Alaska Commercial Co. Transferred to Northern Navigation Co. in 1901. Acquired by WP&YR in 1914. Not used under WP&YR ownership. Abandoned at St. Michael in 1917.
- Named for Hannah Isabelle "Bella" Lilienthal (1856–1923), daughter of AC Co. general manager Louis Sloss.

|- style="vertical-align:top; text-align:center"
|style="text-align:left"|Bonanza King
(Gov. Pingree, 1898–1900)
|U.S.A. #86414 (1898–1900);
Canada #107851 (1900–1955)
|1898
|Seattle, Washington
|Puget Sound Bridge & Dredging Co.
(hull #1)
|466
|140 feet
|style="text-align:left"|Originally owned by Boston & Alaska Transportation Co. Sold to the Yukon Flyer Line in 1900. Resold to P. Burns & Co. Acquired by WP&YR in 1901. Last used as a boat by WP&YR in 1910. Converted to lumber storeroom at Whitehorse, Yukon in 1917. Broken up in 1957.
- Named for Nels Peterson (1850–1939), successful Bonanza Creek miner and owner of the Yukon Flyer Line.

|- style="vertical-align:top; text-align:center"
|style="text-align:left"|Canadian
|Canada #107094
|1898
|Victoria, British Columbia
|John H. Todd
|716
|147 feet
|style="text-align:left"|Originally owned by Canadian Development Co. Acquired by WP&YR in 1901. Last used in 1927. Placed as riprap in Yukon River at Whitehorse, Yukon in 1931. Machinery recovered from river in 1997.
- Most likely, named for the British Columbia, Canada gold rushes of 1850 and 1861.

|- style="vertical-align:top; text-align:center"
|style="text-align:left"|1st Casca
|Canada #103919
|1898
|Victoria, British Columbia
|Esquimalt Marine Railway Co.
(hull #1)
|590
|140 feet
|style="text-align:left"|Originally owned by Casca Trading & Transportation Co. Sold to Otto R. Bremmer in 1899 or 1900. Resold to Ironside, Rennie & Campbell Co. in 1903. Acquired by WP&YR in 1904. Last used in 1909. Broken up at Lower Laberge, Yukon in 1911.
- Kaska may have originated as a Tahltan term, which means old moccasins, and which was a scornful name for the Kaska tribe.

|- style="vertical-align:top; text-align:center"
|style="text-align:left"|2nd Casca
|Canada #103919
|1911
|Whitehorse, Yukon
|WP&YR
|1079
|161 feet
|style="text-align:left"|Foundered at Rink Rapids, Yukon in 1936.
- Kaska may have originated as a Tahltan term, which means old moccasins, and which was a scornful name for the Kaska tribe.

|- style="vertical-align:top; text-align:center"
|style="text-align:left"|3rd Casca
|Canada #170618
|1937
|Whitehorse, Yukon
|WP&YR
|1300
|180 feet
|style="text-align:left"|Last used in 1951. Transferred to Canadian Government in 1960. Demolished by fire (arson) at Whitehorse in 1974.
- Kaska may have originated as a Tahltan term, which means old moccasins, and which was a scornful name for the Kaska tribe.

|- style="vertical-align:top; text-align:center"
|style="text-align:left"|Chas. H. Hamilton
|U.S.A. #127290
|1897
|St. Michael, Alaska
|Moran Bros.
(hull #3)
|595
|190 feet
|style="text-align:left"|Originally owned by North American Transportation & Trading Co. Sold to Northern Navigation Co. in 1911. Acquired by WP&YR in 1914. Not used under WP&YR ownership. Sold by WP&YR and abandoned by new owner at St. Michael Canal, Alaska in 1927.
- Named for Charles H. Hamilton (1872–1929), manager of the NAT&T Co.

|- style="vertical-align:top; text-align:center"
|style="text-align:left"|Clifford Sifton
|Canada #107528
|1898
|Bennett, British Columbia
|Dominion Steamboat Line
|291
|120 feet
|style="text-align:left"|Originally owned by Dominion Steamboat. Acquired by WP&YR in 1903. Last used as a powered vessel in 1903. Converted to barge 1st Hootalinqua in 1904. Demolished in a collision at Dawson City, Yukon in 1905.

|- style="vertical-align:top; text-align:center"
|style="text-align:left"|Columbian
|Canada #107091
|1898
|Victoria, British Columbia
|John H. Todd
|716
|147 feet
|style="text-align:left"|Originally owned by Canadian Development Co. Acquired by WP&YR in 1901. Exploded at Eagle Rock, Yukon in 1906.
- Most likely, named for the (British) Columbia, Canada gold rushes of 1850 and 1861.

|- style="vertical-align:top; text-align:center"
|style="text-align:left"|D. R. Campbell
|U.S.A. #157509
|1898
|Seattle, Washington
|Moran Bros.
(hull #23)
|718
|176 feet
|style="text-align:left"|Originally owned by Seattle-Yukon Transportation Co. Transferred to Northern Navigation Co. in 1901. Acquired by WP&YR in 1914. Not used under WP&YR ownership. Sold by WP&YR and abandoned by new owner at St. Michael Canal, Alaska in 1927.
- Named for David R. Campbell (1830–1911), a Maine wool manufacturer who financed the SYT Co.

|- style="vertical-align:top; text-align:center"
|style="text-align:left"|Dalton
|U.S.A. #157507
|1898
|Port Blakely, Washington
|Hall Bros.
|523
|150 feet
|style="text-align:left"|Originally owned by Canadian Pacific Ry. Acquired by WP&YR in 1901. Not used under WP&YR ownership. Sold to S. Willey Steamship & Navigation Co. and renamed Capital City in 1901. Resold to McDonald Steamship Co. in 1903. Resold to Olympia-Tacoma Navigation Co. in 1904. Resold to Dallas, Portland & Astoria Navigation Co. in 1906. Broken up in 1919.
- Named for John "Jack" Dalton (1856–1944), Alaskan packer.

|- style="vertical-align:top; text-align:center"
|style="text-align:left"|Dawson
|Canada #107836
|1901
|Whitehorse, Yukon
|W. D. Hofius & Co. for WP&YR
|778
|167 feet
|style="text-align:left"|Foundered at Rink Rapids, Yukon in 1926.

|- style="vertical-align:top; text-align:center"
|style="text-align:left"|Delta
|U.S.A. #202463
|1905
|St. Michael, Alaska
|Joseph M. Supple and Thomas Achilles
|293
|120 feet
|style="text-align:left"|Originally owned by Northern Navigation Co. Acquired by WP&YR in 1914. Last used in 1916. Abandoned at St. Michael in 1936.

|- style="vertical-align:top; text-align:center"
|style="text-align:left"|F. K. Gustin
|U.S.A. #121071
|1898
|Seattle, Washington
|Moran Bros.
(hull #24)
|718
|176 feet
|style="text-align:left"|Originally owned by Seattle-Yukon Transportation Co. Transferred to Northern Navigation Co. in 1901. Acquired by WP&YR in 1914. Not used under WP&YR ownership. Abandoned at St. Marys, Alaska in 1917.
- Named for Frederick K. Gustin (1856–1937), Chicago, Illinois lawyer, and secretary and treasurer of the SYT Co.

|- style="vertical-align:top; text-align:center"
|style="text-align:left"|G. M. Dawson
|U.S.A. #111544
|1901
|Vancouver, British Columbia
|Canadian Pacific Ry.
|550
|151 feet
|style="text-align:left"| Originally owned by C.P. Ry. Acquired by WP&YR in 1901. Not used under WP&YR ownership. Stripped and hull sold by WP&YR in 1901. Hull abandoned at Queen Charlotte Island, British Columbia.

|- style="vertical-align:top; text-align:center"
|style="text-align:left"|Gov. Pingree
|......
|......
|......
|......
|......
|......
|style="text-align:left"|See, Bonanza King.

|- style="vertical-align:top; text-align:center"
|style="text-align:left"|Gleaner
|Canada #107526
|1899
|Bennett, British Columbia
|John Irving Navigation Co.
|241
|113 feet
|style="text-align:left"|Originally owned by Irving Navigation. Acquired by WP&YR in 1901. Last used in 1923. Scuttled in Nares Lake, Yukon between 1950 & 1958.
- A gleaner is one who gathers a crop after it is reaped.

|- style="vertical-align:top; text-align:center"
|style="text-align:left"|Hamlin
|Canada #107144
|1898
|Vancouver, British Columbia
|Canadian Pacific Ry.
|515
|146 feet
|style="text-align:left"| Originally owned by C.P. Ry. Acquired by WP&YR in 1901. Not used under WP&YR ownership. Sold to John Banser, William McCallum, and David Reider in 1902. Resold to Thomas J. Kickham in 1904. Resold to Edward J. Coyle (dealer) in 1910. Resold to Hamlin Towing Co. in 1911. Resold to James H. Green in 1917. Resold to Defiance Packing Co. in 1918. Foundered in Fraser River, British Columbia in 1918.
- Named for Charles Sumner Hamlin (1861–1938), U.S. delegate to the 1897 Anglo-American fur seal fishing convention.

|- style="vertical-align:top; text-align:center"
|style="text-align:left"|Hannah
|U.S.A. #96428
|1898
|Unalaska, Alaska
|Howard Shipyards & Dock Co.
|1130
|223 feet
|style="text-align:left"|Originally owned by Alaska Commercial Co. Transferred to Northern Navigation Co. in 1901. Acquired by WP&YR in 1914. Not used under WP&YR ownership. Abandoned at St. Michael, Alaska in 1917. Demolished by fire at St. Michael shortly after 1944.  Had a horizontal, belt-driven electric generator made by A. L. Ide & Sons.  This may be the A. L. Ide & Sons unit that is currently on the beach at St. Michael.
- Boat named for Hannah Gerstle (1838–1930), wife of AC Co. president Lewis Gerstle.

|- style="vertical-align:top; text-align:center"
|style="text-align:left"|Herman
|U.S.A. #96398
|1898
|Dutch Harbor, Alaska
|Thomas P. H. Whitelaw
|456
|175 feet
|style="text-align:left"|Originally owned by Alaska Exploration Co. Transferred to Northern Navigation Co. in 1901. Acquired by WP&YR in 1914. Last used in 1922. Sold by WP&YR and abandoned by new owner at St. Michael, Alaska in 1927.
- Named for Herman Liebes (1842–1898), head of the AE Co.

|- style="vertical-align:top; text-align:center"
|style="text-align:left"|Ida May
(Rideout, 1898–1905)
|U.S.A. #111182 (1898–1900 & 1905–1917);
Canada #107855 (1900–1905)
|1898
|Stockton, California
|California Navigation & Improvement Co.
|278
|149 feet
|style="text-align:left"|Originally owned by California Yukon Trading Co. On Dall River, Alaska during winter of 1898–1899.  Owned by J. A. Smilie by 1902.  Sold to Northern Navigation Co. in 1905. Acquired by WP&YR in 1914. Not used under WP&YR ownership. Abandoned at St. Michael, Alaska in 1917.
- Originally named for Walter R. Rideout (1867–1926), president of CYT Co.

|- style="vertical-align:top; text-align:center"
|style="text-align:left"|Isabelle
|U.S.A. #100779
|1902
|St. Michael, Alaska
|Elbridge T. "E.T." Barnette
|162
|87 feet
|style="text-align:left"|Originally owned by Barnette. Sold to Northern Navigation Co. in 1904. Acquired by WP&YR in 1914. Not used under WP&YR ownership. Abandoned at St. Marys, Alaska in 1917.
- Named for Isabelle Cleary Barnette (1875–1942), wife of E.T.

|- style="vertical-align:top; text-align:center"
|style="text-align:left"|J. P. Light
|U.S.A. #77296 (1898–1900 & 1905–1927);
Canada #107860 (1900–1905)
|1898
|Seattle, Washington
|Moran Bros.
(hull #22)
|785
|176 feet
|style="text-align:left"|Originally owned by British America Corp. (J. Whitaker Wright). Sold to Dawson & White Horse Navigation Co. in 1900. Sold to Coal Creek Coal Co. in 1904.  Sold to Tanana Trading Co. in 1905. Sold to North American Transportation & Trading Co. in 1906. Sold to Northern Navigation Co. in 1911. Acquired by WP&YR in 1914. Not used under WP&YR ownership. Sold by WP&YR and abandoned by new owner at St. Michael Canal, Alaska in 1927.
- Named for Joseph P. Light (1846–1922), vice president of the Seattle-Yukon Transportation Co.

|- style="vertical-align:top; text-align:center"
|style="text-align:left"|John C. Barr
|U.S.A. #77326 (1898–1899 & 1902–1927);
Canada #107853 (1899–1902)
|1898
|Dutch Harbor, Alaska
|Craig Shipbuilding
|546
|145 feet
|style="text-align:left"|Originally owned by North American Transportation & Trading Co. Sold to Northern Navigation Co. in 1911. Acquired by WP&YR in 1914. Not used under WP&YR ownership. Converted to stationary power plant for marine ways at St. Michael, Alaska in 1917. Sold by WP&YR and abandoned by new owner at St. Michael in 1927.
- Named for Capt. John C. Barr (1844–1925), of the NAT&T Co.

|- style="vertical-align:top; text-align:center"
|style="text-align:left"|John Cudahy
|U.S.A. #77334
|1898
|Dutch Harbor, Alaska
|Moran Bros.
(hull #14)
|819
|192 feet
|style="text-align:left"|Originally owned by North American Transportation & Trading Co. Sold to Northern Navigation Co. in 1911. Acquired by WP&YR in 1914. Not used under WP&YR ownership. Sold by WP&YR and abandoned by new owner at St. Michael, Alaska in 1927.
- Named for John Cudahy (1843–1915), Chicago merchant and director of NAT&T Co.

|- style="vertical-align:top; text-align:center"
|style="text-align:left"|John J. Healy
|U.S.A. #77238
|1898
|St. Michael, Alaska
|North American Transportation & Trading Co.
|450
|175 feet
|style="text-align:left"|Originally owned by NAT&T Co. Sold to Northern Navigation Co. in 1911. Acquired by WP&YR in 1914. Not used under WP&YR ownership. Sold by WP&YR and abandoned by new owner at St. Michael in 1927.

|- style="vertical-align:top; text-align:center"
|style="text-align:left"|Joseph Clossett
|Canada #107621
|1898
|Bennett, British Columbia
|John F. Steffan
|147
|80 feet
|style="text-align:left"|Originally owned by William J. Rant. Sold to Upper Yukon Co., and resold to Canadian Development Co. in 1899. Acquired by WP&YR in 1901. Last used in 1903. Broken up at Whitehorse, Yukon in 1931.
- Named for Joseph Clossett (1845–1915), of Portland, Oregon.

|- style="vertical-align:top; text-align:center"
|style="text-align:left"|Julia B
|U.S.A. #205169
|1908
|Seattle, Washington
|Cook & Lake Shipyards
|835
|159 feet
|style="text-align:left"|Originally owned by Yukon Transportation & Trading Co. Sold to the Western Transportation Co. in 1912. Acquired by WP&YR in 1918. Last used in 1923. Sold by WP&YR and abandoned by new owner near Dawson City, Yukon in 1942.
- Named for Julia M. Burrichter (1871–1933), wife of YT&T Co. owner Frank J. Burrichter.

|- style="vertical-align:top; text-align:center"
|style="text-align:left"|Keno
|Canada #116618
|1922
|Whitehorse, Yukon
|WP&YR
|613
|141 feet
|style="text-align:left"|Last used by WP&YR in 1950. Transferred to Canadian Government in 1960. Last commercial steamboat to operate under its own power on the Yukon River, run from Whitehorse to Dawson City, Yukon, August 26–29, 1960. Put on display at Dawson City in 1960.
- Keno was ultimately derived from a French term which means five winning numbers; a game of chance. The boat was immediately named for the Keno claim, staked in 1919 by Alfred Kirk Schellinger.

|- style="vertical-align:top; text-align:center"
|style="text-align:left"|1st Klondike
|Canada #116627
|1929
|Whitehorse, Yukon
|WP&YR
|1285
|210 feet
|style="text-align:left"|Foundered at Hootalinqua, Yukon in 1936.
- Klondike was derived from the Hän idiom Tr'o Ndek, which figuratively means hammer river.  Literally, it means Chinook (King) Salmon River.  The reason for the figurative meaning is that hammers had been used to erect barriers in the Klondike River, in order to catch the Chinook salmon.

|- style="vertical-align:top; text-align:center"
|style="text-align:left"|2nd Klondike
|Canada #156744
|1937
|Whitehorse, Yukon
|WP&YR
|1363
|210 feet
|style="text-align:left"|Last steamboat in regular service on the Upper Yukon River: completed its last voyage on July 4, 1955. Transferred to Canadian Government in 1960. Put on display at Whitehorse in 1966.
- Klondike was derived from the Hän idiom Tr'o Ndek, which figuratively means hammer river.  Literally, it means Chinook (King) Salmon River.  The reason for the figurative meaning is that hammers had been used to erect barriers in the Klondike River, in order to catch the Chinook salmon.

|- style="vertical-align:top; text-align:center"
|style="text-align:left"|Klondyke
|U.S.A. #161114
|1898
|Dutch Harbor, Alaska
|Moran Bros.
(hull #13)
|406
|121 feet
|style="text-align:left"|Originally owned by North American Transportation & Trading Co. Sold to Northern Navigation Co. in 1911. Acquired by WP&YR in 1914. Last used in 1917. Abandoned at St. Michael, Alaska in 1936.
- Klondyke was derived from the Hän idiom Tr'o Ndek, which figuratively means hammer river.  Literally, it means Chinook (King) Salmon River.  The reason for the figurative meaning is that hammers had been used to erect barriers in the Klondike River, in order to catch the Chinook salmon.

|- style="vertical-align:top; text-align:center"
|style="text-align:left"|LaFrance
|Canada #107866
|1902
|Lower Laberge, Yukon
|Edward J. Smythe
|201
|100 feet
|style="text-align:left"|Originally owned by Merchants Transportation Co. Acquired by WP&YR in 1903. Last used by WP&YR in 1905. Sold to Side Streams Navigation Co. in 1908. Foundered and demolished by fire near the mouth of LaFrance Creek, Yukon in 1911.
- Named for Edmond "Edward" LaFrance (1861–1908), Winnipeg butcher, Yukon cattle dealer.

|- style="vertical-align:top; text-align:center"
|style="text-align:left"|Lavelle Young
|U.S.A. #141529
|1898
|Portland, Oregon
|Joseph Paquette
|506
|140 feet
|style="text-align:left"|Originally owned by Columbia River Pilots Assn.  At Peavey, Alaska on the Koyukuk River during the winter of 1898–1899.  Sold to Capt. Charles W. Adams, Thomas Bruce, and George Crummy in 1900. Sold to Northern Navigation Co. in 1903. Acquired by WP&YR in 1914. Not used under WP&YR ownership. Sold to Thomas A. McGowan and converted to a barge in 1920. Subsequently, abandoned at McGrath, Alaska. Remains are on display at Pioneer Park, Fairbanks, Alaska.
- Named for Lavelle Gilbert, née Young (1896–1994), granddaughter of Charles W. Young, a prominent shipper on the Columbia River.

|- style="vertical-align:top; text-align:center"
|style="text-align:left"|Leon
|U.S.A. #141533
|1898
|Dutch Harbor, Alaska
|Thomas P. H. Whitelaw
|638
|181 feet
|style="text-align:left"|Originally owned by Alaska Exploration Co. Transferred to Northern Navigation Co. in 1901. Acquired by WP&YR in 1914. Not used under WP&YR ownership. Abandoned at St. Michael, Alaska in 1943.
- Named for Leon Liebes (1886–1951), son of AE Co. president Isaac Liebes.

|- style="vertical-align:top; text-align:center"
|style="text-align:left"|Lightning
|Canada #107156
|1898
|Vancouver, British Columbia
|B.C. Iron Works
|557
|140 feet
|style="text-align:left"|Originally owned by British America Corp. (J. Whitaker Wright). Sold to Dawson & White Horse Navigation Co. in 1900. Resold to Coal Creek Coal Co. in 1903. Resold to Sour Dough Coal Co. in 1907. Resold to Northern Light, Power & Coal Co. in 1909. Acquired by WP&YR in 1917. Not used under WP&YR ownership. Broken up at Dawson City, Yukon in 1918.

|- style="vertical-align:top; text-align:center"
|style="text-align:left"|Linda
|U.S.A. #141561
|1898
|Dutch Harbor, Alaska
|Thomas P. H. Whitelaw
|692
|181 feet
|style="text-align:left"|Originally owned by Alaska Exploration Co. Transferred to Northern Navigation Co. in 1901. Acquired by WP&YR in 1914. Not used under WP&YR ownership. Abandoned across the bay from St. Michael, Alaska in 1917.
- Named for Linda Liebes Lederman (1884–1964), daughter of AE Co. president Isaac Liebes.

|- style="vertical-align:top; text-align:center"
|style="text-align:left"|Louise
|U.S.A. #141572
|1898
|Unalaska, Alaska
|Howard Shipyards & Dock Co.
|717
|165 feet
|style="text-align:left"|Originally owned by Alaska Commercial Co. Transferred to Northern Navigation Co. in 1901. Acquired by WP&YR in 1914. Last used in 1920. Abandoned at St. Michael, Alaska in 1943.
- Named for Louisa Greenewald (1836–1917), wife of AC Co. official Simon Greenewald.

|- style="vertical-align:top; text-align:center"
|style="text-align:left"|M. L. Washburn
|U.S.A. #209341
|1911
|St. Michael, Alaska
|Northern Navigation Co.
|284
|120 feet
|style="text-align:left"|Originally owned by Northern Navigation. Acquired by WP&YR in 1914. Foundered just south of Little Salmon, Yukon in 1920.
- Named for Martin L. Washburn (1854–1911), general manager of the NN Co.

|- style="vertical-align:top; text-align:center"
|style="text-align:left"|Margaret
|U.S.A. #92890
|1897
|St. Michael, Alaska
|Alaska Commercial Co.
|520
|140 feet
|style="text-align:left"|Originally owned by Alaska Commercial Co. Hull previously had been barge St. Michael No. 1 (U.S.A. Official No. 57983, built in 1896). Transferred to Northern Navigation Co. in 1901. Acquired by WP&YR in 1914. Not used under WP&YR ownership. Abandoned at St. Marys, Alaska in 1917.
- Named for Margaret Stern, née Wilson (1895–1973), daughter of AC Co. superintendent James M. Wilson.

|- style="vertical-align:top; text-align:center"
|style="text-align:left"|Mary F. Graff
|U.S.A. #92856 (1898–1900);
Canada #107839 (1900–1928)
|1898
|Seattle, Washington
|Moran Bros.
(hull #30)
|864
|177 feet
|style="text-align:left"|Built for the British America Corp. (J. Whitaker Wright), but sold to Blue Star Navigation Co. On Dall River, Alaska during the winter of 1898–1899.  Sold to Alaska Exploration Co. in 1899. Sold to Canadian Development Co. in 1900. Acquired by WP&YR in 1901. Last used in 1903. Abandoned at Dawson City, Yukon in 1928.
- Named for Mary F. Burleigh, née Graff (1874–1962, m. 1898), wife of entrepreneur Andrew F. Burleigh.  In 1897, Andrew Burleigh had contracted with Moran to build the Graff and 11 other steamers (hull ##22-33).  The contract was part of a scheme to build a railroad from Haines, Alaska to Five Finger Rapids on the Yukon River.  But, by the time that the 12 Moran-built steamers were completed, Burleigh no longer had an interest in them or the Haines-Yukon railroad scheme.

|- style="vertical-align:top; text-align:center"
|style="text-align:left"|May West
|......
|......
|......
|......
|......
|......
|style="text-align:left"|See, Vidette.

|- style="vertical-align:top; text-align:center"
|style="text-align:left"|McConnell
|Canada #107152
|1898
|Vancouver, British Columbia
|Canadian Pacific Ry.
|729
|142 feet
|style="text-align:left"| Originally owned by C.P. Ry. Acquired by WP&YR in 1901. Not used under WP&YR ownership. Stripped and hull sold by WP&YR in 1901.
- Named for Richard G. McConnell (1856–1942), the Yukon's foremost geological explorer.

|- style="vertical-align:top; text-align:center"
|style="text-align:left"|Minneapolis
|U.S.A. #92864
|1898
|Tacoma, Washington
|Thomas C. Reed
|236
|109 feet
|style="text-align:left"|Originally owned by Minnesota & Alaska Development Co. Sold to Alaska Transportation Co. in 1909. Sold to Miners' & Merchants' Cooperative Co. in 1910.  Sold to Western Transportation Co. in 1912. Acquired by WP&YR in 1918. Not used under WP&YR ownership. Sold to The Alaska R.R. in 1926. Not used under Alaska R.R. ownership. Abandoned at Chena, Alaska.

|- style="vertical-align:top; text-align:center"
|style="text-align:left"|Monarch
|U.S.A. #92855
|1898
|Ballard, Washington
|Thomas C. Reed
|463
|150 feet
|style="text-align:left"|Originally owned by Columbia Navigation Co. On Dall River, Alaska during the winter of 1898–1899.  Sold to Yukon Independent Transportation Co. in 1901. Resold to Edward R. Sondheim and Dorah W. "D.W." Dobbins in 1904. Resold to Capt. Wallace Langley in 1907. Resold to Peter A. Vachon & Joseph S. Sterling, then resold to Schubach-Hamilton Steamship Co. in 1908.  Sold to Northern Navigation Co. in 1913. Acquired by WP&YR in 1914. Not used under WP&YR ownership. Sold by WP&YR and abandoned by new owner at St. Michael, Alaska in 1927.
(Not to be confused with Monarch, Canada #107863, not owned by WP&YR: see below.)

|- style="vertical-align:top; text-align:center"
|style="text-align:left"|Nasutlin
(2nd Prospector in 1912 only)
|Canada #133738
|1912
|Whitehorse, Yukon
|WP&YR
|570
(405, 1912–1937)
|141 feet
(115 feet, 1912–1937)
|style="text-align:left"|Foundered at Dawson City, Yukon in 1952.
- Nasutlin was a loanword used by the Tagish Indians.  Its origin was neither Tagish nor Tlingit.  (The original Tlingit name for the Nisutlin River had been Héen Tlein [Big River].)  The name Nasutlin was borrowed from the Southern Tutchone nàsät-lį, which means strong flow.

|- style="vertical-align:top; text-align:center"
|style="text-align:left"|Norcom
|Canada #116613
|1913
|St. Michael, Alaska
|Hull: Northern Navigation Co.;
superstructure: Merchants' Yukon Transportation Co.
|352
|130 feet
|style="text-align:left"|Originally owned by Northern Navigation Co. Used by that company to penetrate the Dawson City-Whitehorse route.  Included superstructure from Evelyn (U.S.A. Official No. 205767), plus a new hull. Sold to WP&YR in 1914. Not used under WP&YR ownership. Remains on display at Hootalinqua Island, Yukon.
- Named for the Northern Commercial Co., an affiliate of the Northern Navigation Co.

|- style="vertical-align:top; text-align:center"
|style="text-align:left"|Ogilvie
|Canada #107148
|1898
|Vancouver, British Columbia
|Canadian Pacific Ry.
|742
|147 feet
|style="text-align:left"| Originally owned by C.P. Ry. Acquired by WP&YR in 1901. Not used under WP&YR ownership. Stripped and hull sold by WP&YR in 1901.

|- style="vertical-align:top; text-align:center"
|style="text-align:left"|Oil City
|U.S.A. #155318
|1898
|Seattle, Washington
|Moran Bros.
(hull #33)
|718
|176 feet
|style="text-align:left"|Originally owned by Standard Oil Co. of California. Sold to Charles W. Adams in 1904. Resold to partnership of Adams, the Dominion Commercial Co., and Mersereau Clark in 1905. Resold to Northern Navigation Co. in 1908. Acquired by WP&YR in 1914. Not used as a boat under WP&YR ownership. Used by WP&YR as an office and warehouse at Holy Cross, Alaska. Abandoned in 1943.

|- style="vertical-align:top; text-align:center"
|style="text-align:left"|Pilgrim
|U.S.A. #150778
|1898
|Seattle, Washington
|Moran Bros.
(hull #31)
|718
|176 feet
|style="text-align:left"|Built for the British America Corp. (J. Whitaker Wright), but sold to Blue Star Navigation Co. Sold to Columbia Navigation Co. in 1900. Resold to British-American Steamship Co. (Frank Waterhouse, Ltd.) in 1899. Resold to Northern Navigation Co. in 1901. Acquired by WP&YR in 1914. Not used under WP&YR ownership. Abandoned across the bay from St. Michael, Alaska in 1917.

|- style="vertical-align:top; text-align:center"
|style="text-align:left"|Portus B. Weare
|U.S.A. #150646
|1892
|St. Michael, Alaska
|North American Transportation & Trading Co.
|400
|175 feet
|style="text-align:left"|Originally owned by NAT&T Co. Sold to Northern Navigation Co. in 1911. Acquired by WP&YR in 1914. Not used under WP&YR ownership. Sold by WP&YR and abandoned by new owner at St. Michael, Alaska in 1927.
- Named for Portus B. Weare (1842–1909), chairman of the NAT&T Co.

|- style="vertical-align:top; text-align:center"
|style="text-align:left"|1st Prospector
|Canada #107865
|1901
|Whitehorse, Yukon
|Stewart River Navigation Co.
|263
|111 feet
|style="text-align:left"|Originally owned by Stewart River Navigation. Sold to M. McConnell in 1902. Acquired by WP&YR in 1907. Not used under WP&YR ownership. Broken up at McIntyre Creek, Yukon in 1912.
- Named for the prospectors that it served.

|- style="vertical-align:top; text-align:center"
|style="text-align:left"|2nd Prospector
|......
|......
|......
|......
|......
|......
|style="text-align:left"|See, Nasutlin.

|- style="vertical-align:top; text-align:center"
|style="text-align:left"|Reaper
|......
|......
|......
|......
|......
|......
|style="text-align:left"|See, Zealandian.

|- style="vertical-align:top; text-align:center"
|style="text-align:left"|Reliance
|U.S.A. #204486
|1907
|St. Michael, Alaska
|St. Johns Shipbuilding Co.
|291
|120 feet
|style="text-align:left"|Originally owned by Northern Navigation Co. Acquired by WP&YR in 1914. Last used by WP&YR in 1921. Sold to The Alaska R.R. in 1926. Abandoned at Chena, Alaska.
- Named after Ft. Reliance, Yukon.

|- style="vertical-align:top; text-align:center"
|style="text-align:left"|Rideout
|......
|......
|......
|......
|......
|......
|style="text-align:left"|See, Ida May.

|- style="vertical-align:top; text-align:center"
|style="text-align:left"|S. S. Bailey
|Canada #107715
|1899
|Bennett, British Columbia
|Louis Paquette
|192
|110 feet
|style="text-align:left"|Originally owned by Bennett & Atlin Lake Co. Sold to Canadian Development Co. in 1899. Acquired by WP&YR in 1901. Last used in 1904. Broken up at Whitehorse, Yukon in 1931.
- Named for Stephen S. Bailey (1845–1925), Spokane, Washington, businessman.

|- style="vertical-align:top; text-align:center"
|style="text-align:left"|St. Michael
|U.S.A. #116816
|1898
|Seattle, Washington
|Moran Bros.
(hull #28)
|718
|176 feet
|style="text-align:left"|Originally owned by Empire Transportation Co. Transferred to Northern Navigation Co. in 1901. Acquired by WP&YR in 1914. Not used under WP&YR ownership. Abandoned at St. Marys, Alaska in 1943.
- Village of St. Michael, Alaska named for Vice Admiral Mikhail D. Tebenkov (1802–1872), governor of Russian America.

|- style="vertical-align:top; text-align:center"
|style="text-align:left"|Sarah
|U.S.A. #116856
|1898
|Unalaska, Alaska
|Howard Shipyards & Dock Co.
|1130
|223 feet
|style="text-align:left"|Originally owned by Alaska Commercial Co. Transferred to Northern Navigation Co. in 1901. Acquired by WP&YR in 1914. Last used in 1918. Sold by WP&YR and abandoned by new owner at St. Michael, Alaska in 1927. Demolished by fire at St. Michael shortly after 1944.
- Named for Sarah Sloss (1836–1920), wife of AC Co. general manager Louis Sloss.

|- style="vertical-align:top; text-align:center"
|style="text-align:left"|Schwatka
|U.S.A. #116812
|1898
|Port Blakely, Washington
|Hall Bros.
|484
|146 feet
|style="text-align:left"|Originally owned by Canadian Pacific Ry. Sold to Charles W. Thebo in 1904. Resold to Northern Navigation Co. in 1907. Acquired by WP&YR in 1914. Last used in 1917. Sold to The Alaska Railroad and abandoned near Dawson City, Yukon in 1942.

|- style="vertical-align:top; text-align:center"
|style="text-align:left"|Scotia
|Canada #107829
|1898
|Atlin, British Columbia
|John Irving Navigation Co.
|214
|80 feet
|style="text-align:left"|Operated on Atlin Lake. Originally owned by Irving Navigation. Acquired by WP&YR and enlarged to 214 gross tons in 1901. Last used as a boat in 1918. Used as an office by the Norgold officers from 1937 to 1950.  Demolished by fire at Atlin in 1967.
- Scotia is the Latinized form of Scotland.

|- style="vertical-align:top; text-align:center"
|style="text-align:left"|Scout
|......
|......
|......
|......
|......
|......
|style="text-align:left"|See, Vidette.

|- style="vertical-align:top; text-align:center"
|style="text-align:left"|Seattle
|U.S.A. #116817
|1898
|Seattle, Washington
|Moran Bros.
(hull #25)
|718
|176 feet
|style="text-align:left"|Originally owned by Empire Transportation Co. Transferred to Northern Navigation Co. in 1901. Acquired by WP&YR in 1914. Not used under WP&YR ownership. Abandoned across the bay from St. Michael, Alaska in 1917.

|- style="vertical-align:top; text-align:center"
|style="text-align:left"|Seattle No. 3
|U.S.A. #116854
|1898
|Dutch Harbor, Alaska
|Moran Bros.
(hull #10)
|548
|151 feet
|style="text-align:left"|Originally owned by Seattle-Yukon Transportation Co. Transferred to Northern Navigation Co. in 1901. Acquired by WP&YR in 1914. Last used in 1922. Sold to The Alaska Railroad and abandoned near Dawson City, Yukon in 1942.

|- style="vertical-align:top; text-align:center"
|style="text-align:left"|Selkirk
|Canada #107835
|1901
|Whitehorse, Yukon
|W. D. Hofius & Co. for WP&YR
|777
|167 feet
|style="text-align:left"|Foundered at the mouth of the Stewart River, Yukon in 1920.

|- style="vertical-align:top; text-align:center"
|style="text-align:left"|Susie
|U.S.A. #116855
|1898
|Unalaska, Alaska
|Howard Shipyards & Dock Co.
|1130
|223 feet
|style="text-align:left"|Originally owned by Alaska Commercial Co. Transferred to Northern Navigation Co. in 1901. Acquired by WP&YR in 1914. Last used in 1917. Sold to The Alaska Railroad and abandoned at St. Michael, Alaska in 1942. Demolished by fire at St. Michael shortly after 1944.
- Named for Suzanne Niebaum (1851–1936), wife of AC Co. vice president Capt. Gustave F. Niebaum.

|- style="vertical-align:top; text-align:center"
|style="text-align:left"|Sybil
|Canada #107523
|1898
|Victoria, British Columbia
|James C. Stratford
|653
(622, 1898–1901)
|167 feet
(101 feet, 1898–1901)
|style="text-align:left"|Originally owned by British-American Steamship Co. (Frank Waterhouse, Ltd.). Sold to Canadian Development Co. in 1900. Acquired by WP&YR in 1901. Last used as a powered vessel in 1903. Converted to barge in 1904. Wrecked by ice at Dawson City, Yukon in 1918.

|- style="vertical-align:top; text-align:center"
|style="text-align:left"|T. C. Power
|U.S.A. #145790
|1898
|Dutch Harbor, Alaska
|Moran Bros.
(hull #17)
|819
|192 feet
|style="text-align:left"|Originally owned by North American Transportation & Trading Co. Sold to Northern Navigation Co. in 1911. Acquired by WP&YR in 1914. Not used under WP&YR ownership. Sold by WP&YR and abandoned by new owner at St. Michael, Alaska in 1927.

|- style="vertical-align:top; text-align:center"
|style="text-align:left"|Tacoma
|U.S.A. #145773
|1898
|Seattle, Washington
|Moran Bros.
(hull #26)
|718
|176 feet
|style="text-align:left"|Originally owned by Empire Transportation Co. Transferred to Northern Navigation Co. in 1901. Acquired by WP&YR in 1914. Not used under WP&YR ownership. Abandoned at St. Marys, Alaska in 1927.

|- style="vertical-align:top; text-align:center"
|style="text-align:left"|Tanana
|U.S.A. #201297
|1904
|St. Michael, Alaska
|Northern Commercial Co.
|495
|150 feet
|style="text-align:left"|Originally owned by Northern Navigation Co. Acquired by WP&YR in 1914. Foundered at Minto, Alaska in 1921.
- Tanana derived from the Lower Tanana phrase tene no’, which is not the name of the Tanana River, but is the name of the village.  Means river trail.

|- style="vertical-align:top; text-align:center"
|style="text-align:left"|Thistle
|Canada #107867
|1902
|Lower Laberge, Yukon
|Donald McPhee
|225
|102 feet
|style="text-align:left"|Originally owned by Merchants Transportation Co. Acquired by WP&YR in 1903. Sold to Taylor & Drury in 1919. Foundered in Lake Laberge, Yukon in 1929.
- Named for Thistle Creek, site of minor gold excitement in 1898.

|- style="vertical-align:top; text-align:center"
|style="text-align:left"|Tutshi
|Canada #138695
|1917
|Carcross, Yukon
|Cousins Bros. for WP&YR
|1041
|167 feet
|style="text-align:left"|Last steamboat in regular service in the Yukon: last voyage in September 1955. Put on display at Carcross in 1972. Demolished by fire (arson) at Carcross in 1990.
- Tutshi was derived from the Tlingit metaphor t’ooch’ áayi, which literally means charcoal lake,<ref name=Tutshi>{{cite book|url= http://www.sealaskaheritage.org/sites/default/files/Tlingit_dictionary_web.pdf|title=Dictionary of Tlingit|pages=16 (When possessed, alienable nouns require the possession suffix -[y]i), 47 (áa [lake]), 255 (t’ooch’ [charcoal])|author=Edwards, Keri|publisher=Sealaska Heritage Institute|year=2009|isbn=978-0-9825786-6-7|access-date=2015-09-14}}.  Tlingit had fewer adjectives than other languages.  Id. at page 14 (a very small category in Tlingit).  This shortage of adjectives occasionally necessitated the use of substitute lexical items, such as metaphors.  Sometime after Tutshi Lake had acquired its name, the word t’ooch’ did evolve also to be a standard adjective meaning black.  If t’ooch’ had been an adjective meaning black at the time that the lake acquired its name, then the name would not have needed the possession suffix (-i).  The name would have been Áa t’ooch’.</ref> and figuratively means dark lake.  Tutshi Lake is darker than most lakes in the region because it is not fed by glacial runoff.

|- style="vertical-align:top; text-align:center"
|style="text-align:left"|Tyrrell
|Canada #107159
|1898
|Vancouver, British Columbia
|Canadian Pacific Ry.
|678
|142 feet
|style="text-align:left"|Originally owned by C.P. Ry. Sold to British America Corp. (J. Whitaker Wright) in 1898. Resold to Dawson & White Horse Navigation Co. in 1900. Resold to John M. Carson in 1904. Resold to Frank W. Arnold in 1905. Acquired by WP&YR in 1906. Not used under WP&YR ownership. Broken up at Dawson City, Yukon in 1918.

|- style="vertical-align:top; text-align:center"
|style="text-align:left"|Victoria
|U.S.A. #116811
|1898
|Seattle, Washington
|Moran Bros.
(hull #27)
|718
|176 feet
|style="text-align:left"|Originally owned by Empire Transportation Co. Transferred to Northern Navigation Co. in 1901. Acquired by WP&YR in 1914. Not used under WP&YR ownership. Abandoned at St. Marys, Alaska in 1927.

|- style="vertical-align:top; text-align:center"
|style="text-align:left"|Victorian
|Canada #103917
|1898
|Victoria, British Columbia
|John H. Todd
|716
|146 feet
|style="text-align:left"|Originally owned by Canadian Development Co. Acquired by WP&YR in 1901. Last used in 1908. Broken up at Dawson City, Yukon in 1928.
- Most likely, named for the Victoria, Australia gold rush of 1851.

|- style="vertical-align:top; text-align:center"
|style="text-align:left"|Vidette
(May West, 1897–1902; Scout, 1902–1903)
|U.S.A. #92896 (1897–1902);
Canada #107869 (1902–1917)
|1897
|St. Michael, Alaska
|Payson C. Richardson, Sr.
|254
(134, 1897–1911)
|119 feet
(96 feet, 1897–1911)
|style="text-align:left"|Originally owned by Richardson. Transferred to George B. Wilson in 1901. Sold to the North-West Mounted Police in 1902. Sold to Side Streams Navigation Co. in 1911. Rename to Yorke Barrington proposed in 1911, but never accomplished.  Acquired by WP&YR in 1916. Foundered in Lake Laberge, Yukon in 1917.
- Originally named for Anna May Richardson, née West (1862–1939), wife of Payson C., Sr.  Vidette is a misspelling of vedette, which is a mounted sentinel in advance of an army for observing enemy activities.

|- style="vertical-align:top; text-align:center"
|style="text-align:left"|White Horse
|......
|......
|......
|......
|......
|......
|style="text-align:left"|See, Whitehorse.

|- style="vertical-align:top; text-align:center"
|style="text-align:left"|White Seal
|U.S.A. #202409
|1905
|Fairbanks, Alaska
|George P. Sproul, George Coleman, and Bert Smith
|193
|97 feet
|style="text-align:left"|Originally owned by Sproul. Owned by Tanana Mines R.R. for a short time in 1905, but ownership reverted to Sproul. Acquired by WP&YR in 1915. Not used under WP&YR ownership. Sold to The Alaska Railroad in 1926. Immediately resold by The A.R.R.
- Named after Kotik, a character in The Jungle Book by Rudyard Kipling.

|- style="vertical-align:top; text-align:center"
|style="text-align:left"|Whitehorse
(White Horse, 1901–1930)
|Canada #107837
|1901
|Whitehorse, Yukon
|W. D. Hofius & Co. for WP&YR
|1120
(986, 1901–1930)
|171 feet
(167 feet, 1901–1930)
|style="text-align:left"|Last used in 1953. Transferred to Canadian Government in 1960. Demolished by fire (arson) at Whitehorse in 1974.
- White Horse was an early spelling of Whitehorse; refers to appearance of rapids in Yukon River.

|- style="vertical-align:top; text-align:center"
|style="text-align:left"|Wilbur Crimmin
|U.S.A. #81606 (1898–1900 & 1906–1935);
Canada #107864 (1900–1906)
|1898
|Coupeville, Washington
|Howard B. Lovejoy
|124
|80 feet
|style="text-align:left"|Originally owned by John D. Crimmin, Jr. At Peavey, Alaska on the Koyukuk River during the winter of 1898–1899.  Sold to Wallace Langley and A. John Engvick in 1900. Transferred to Langley, alone, in 1904.  Sold to Charles W. Adams, Dominion Commercial Co., and Mersereau & Clark in 1906. Resesold to Northern Navigation Co. in 1908. Acquired by WP&YR in 1914. Not used under WP&YR ownership. Sold to Waechter Bros. in 1923. Abandoned at Seward, Alaska in 1935.
- Named for Exilona L. Wilbur (1845–1920) and John D. Crimmin, Sr. (1835–1906), parents of John D., Jr.

|- style="vertical-align:top; text-align:center"
|style="text-align:left"|Will H. Isom
|U.S.A. #81758
|1901
|Ballard, Washington
|Andrew Axton & Son Co.
|983
|184 feet
|style="text-align:left"|Originally owned by North American Transportation & Trading Co. Forced ashore by ice storm at Point Romanof, Alaska on August 20, 1902.  Towed to St. Michael, Alaska, in 1903, never to run again.  Sold to Northern Navigation Co. in 1911. Acquired by WP&YR in 1914. Not used under WP&YR ownership. Sold by WP&YR and abandoned by new owner at St. Michael in 1927.
- Named for William H. Isom (1828–1929), vice president of the NAT&T Co.

|- style="vertical-align:top; text-align:center"
|style="text-align:left"|Yorke Barrington
|......
|......
|......
|......
|......
|......
|style="text-align:left"|See, Remarks for Vidette.

|- style="vertical-align:top; text-align:center"
|style="text-align:left"|2nd Yukon
|U.S.A. #165172
|1913
|Seattle, Washington (hull);
Whitehorse, Yukon (superstructure)
|Nilson & Kelez Shipbuilding Corp. (hull);
WP&YR (superstructure)
|651
|170 feet
|style="text-align:left"|Sold to The Alaska R.R. in 1942. Damaged by ice at Tanana, Alaska in 1947. Demolished by fire at Tanana in 1948.
- The name Yukon, or ųųg han, is a contraction of the words in the Gwichʼin phrase chųų gąįį han, which mean white water river and which refer to "the pale colour" of glacial runoff in the Yukon River.In Gwichʼin, adjectives, such as choo [big] and gąįį [white], follow the nouns that they modify.  Thus, white water is chųų gąįį [water white].  White water river is chųų gąįį han [water white river].    The contraction is Ųųg Han, if the \ųų\ remains nasalized, or Yuk Han, if there is no vowel nasalization.  In the 1840s, different tribes had different opinions as to the literal meaning of Yukon.  In 1843, the Holikachuks had told the Russian-American Company that their name for the river was Yukkhana and that this name meant "big river."  However, Yukkhana does not literally correspond to a Holikachuk phrase that means big river.Thirty-nine pages of cited "Sources," representing over a century of research, did not verify Zagoskin's report that Yukon means big river.  , at pp. 6-44 ("Sources of Names"), 1069 ("The Eskimo ... descriptively called it 'Kuikpak' meaning 'big river.'  The Indian name 'Yukon' probably means the same thing.").  Orth does not say "probably" when discussing Kuikpak meaning.  Orth's use of "probably" is limited to the discussion of Yukon meaning, which indicates that Zagoskin's report that Yukon means big river was never verified.  In addition, Orth's "Sources" do not even include the Hudson's Bay Company correspondence, which states that Yukon means white water river in Gwichʼin.  Nor do Orth's "Sources" include aboriginal dictionaries.  Then, two years later, the Gwichʼins told the Hudson's Bay Company that their name for the river was Yukon and that the name meant white water river.  White water river in fact corresponds to Gwichʼin words that can be shortened to form Yukon.  Because the Holikachuks had been trading regularly with both the Gwichʼins and the Yup'iks, the Holikachuks were in a position to borrow the Gwichʼin contraction and to conflate its meaning with the meaning of Kuig-pak [River-big], which is the Yup'ik name for the same river.  For that reason, the documentary evidence suggests that the Holikachuks had borrowed the contraction Ųųg Han [White Water River] from Gwichʼin, and erroneously assumed that this contraction had the same literal meaning as the corresponding Yup'ik name Kuig-pak [River-big].

|- style="vertical-align:top; text-align:center"
|style="text-align:left"|Yukoner
|Canada #107098
|1898
|St. Michael, Alaska
|Canadian Pacific Navigation Co. (not associated with Canadian Pacific Ry. at the time)
|781
|171 feet
|style="text-align:left"|Originally owned by CP Nav. Co. (not associated with C.P. Ry. at the time). Sold to North British American Trading & Transportation Co. in 1898. Resold to Trading & Exploration Co. in 1899. Resold to Canadian Development Co. in 1900. Acquired by WP&YR in 1901. Last used in 1903. Sold and broken up at Whitehorse, Yukon in 1957.
- For remarks relating to the name Yukon, see, Remarks for 2nd Yukon, U.S.A. #165172, above.

|- style="vertical-align:top; text-align:center"
|style="text-align:left"|Zealandian
(Reaper in 1900 only)
|Canada #107830
|1900
|Bennett, British Columbia
|Alexander Watson
|179
|102 feet
|style="text-align:left"|Originally owned by John Irving Navigation Co. and named Reaper.  Sold to the Canadian Development Co. and renamed Zealandian in 1900. Acquired by WP&YR in 1901. Last used in 1904. Broken up at Whitehorse, Yukon in 1913.
- Most likely, named for the Otago, New Zealand gold rush of 1864.
|}White Pass Barges (102 vessels): 25 barges built by White Pass.  58 barges (including 7 not used) purchased from the Northern Navigation and Northern Commercial Cos.  19 barges (including 2 not used) purchased from others.

No. of Barges used in each year: 1903–4; 1904–7; 1905–8; 1906–10; 1907–13; 1908 to 1912–12; 1913–13; 1914 to 1916–63 (reflects purchase of Northern Navigation Co.); 1917–58; 1918 and 1919–55; 1920–54; 1921–47; 1922–45; 1923–42 (reflects end of service west of Tanana); 1924–32; 1925 and 1926–23; 1927 and 1928–24; 1929–26; 1930–22; 1931–21; 1932–22; 1933–21; 1934 to 1937–20; 1938 to 1940–18; 1941–17; 1942–16; 1943–12 (reflects end of service west of Dawson); 1944 to 1947–13; 1948–15; 1949–16; 1950–14; 1951–12.

For the roster of White Pass winter stages, see, Overland Trail (Yukon).

For the roster of White Pass railroad equipment, see, List of White Pass and Yukon Route locomotives and cars.

Alaska Railroad vessels

{| class="wikitable"
|+A.R.R. Gasoline Power – Stern Wheel Boats (2 vessels)
|- style="vertical-align:bottom"
! Name
! Registry
! Year Built
! Where Built
! Builder
! Volume (gross tons)
! Hull Length
! Remarks

|- style="vertical-align:top; text-align:center"
|style="text-align:left"|Matanuska
|None
|1915
|Seattle, Washington
|Alaskan Engineering Commission
|
|66 feet
|style="text-align:left"|A.E.C. reorganized as The Alaska Railroad in 1923. Matanuska transferred to Civil Aeronautics Administration in 1951.
- Name derived from an unknown Russian phrase that was corrupted by the Dena'ina Indians, and that relates both to copper (медь → med''') and to the Ahtna Indians.

|- style="vertical-align:top; text-align:center"
|style="text-align:left"|Midnight Sun
|None
|1911
|Whitehorse, Yukon
|
|
|45 feet
|style="text-align:left"|Originally assigned to the U.S. Coast & Geodetic Survey.  Transferred to the Alaskan Engineering Commission in 1915.  Used on the Tanana River.  Disposed of between 1924 & 1930.
- Most A.E.C. boats that were initially used on the Tanana River had names consisting of "Sun" plus another word.
|}

Other vessels
The following lists many pre-1955 vessels of the Yukon River, tributaries, and headwaters that are not listed above. It is not a complete list.

{| class="wikitable"
|+Misc. Yukon River Steam Power – Screw Propeller Boats
|- style="vertical-align:bottom"
! Name! Registry (-ies)
! Year Built
! Where Built
! Builder
! Volume (gross tons)
! Hull Length
! Remarks

|- style="vertical-align:top; text-align:center"
|style="text-align:left"|Alaska|U.S.A. #107458
|1899
|Seattle, Washington
|Moran Bros.
|60
|74 feet
|style="text-align:left"|Originally owned by Empire Transportation Co. Transferred to Northern Navigation Co. in 1901. Demolished by fire at Winter Quarters in 1906.
- Alaska was derived from an Aleut idiom, which figuratively refers to the mainland of Alaska.  Literally, it means object to which the action of the sea is directed.

|- style="vertical-align:top; text-align:center"
|style="text-align:left"|Alert|Canada #107515
|1898
|Lindeman, British Columbia
|G. Milne
|9
|34 feet
|style="text-align:left"|Operated on Lindeman Lake.  Owned by John J. McKenna.  Registry closed in 1919.

|- style="vertical-align:top; text-align:center"
|style="text-align:left"|Alpha|U.S.A. #107404 (1898–1899);
Canada #107924 (1899–1920)
|1898
|Seattle, Washington
|
|10
|38 feet
|style="text-align:left"|Originally owned by Arthur R. Auston. At the Hogatza River, Alaska during the winter of 1898–1899.  Sold to Lewis McLachlan in 1902.  Out of commission and registry closed in 1920.

|- style="vertical-align:top; text-align:center"
|style="text-align:left"|Aquila|None
|1889
|Bristol, Rhode Island
|Herreschoff Mfg. Co.
(hull #157)
|
|48 feet
|style="text-align:left"|Originally owned by William Randolph Hearst.  Sold in 1895.  Resold to Capt. Edward M. Barrington in February 1898.  Operated on the Upper Yukon River in 1898.  Bent its propeller at Forty Mile, Yukon in September 1898.  Barrington died in 1899.  Boat broken up in 1900.
- Aquila is the Italian word for eagle.

|- style="vertical-align:top; text-align:center"
|style="text-align:left"|Argonaut|U.S.A. #107403
|1898
|St. Michael, Alaska
|Ildo Ransdell
|15
|50 feet
|style="text-align:left"|Originally owned by Alaska Exploration Co. At Koyukuk River, Alaska during winter of 1898–1899.  Transferred to Northern Navigation Co. in 1901. Wrecked at Stewart, Yukon in 1912.

|- style="vertical-align:top; text-align:center"
|style="text-align:left"|Blair of Athol|Canada #111608
|1900
|New Westminster, British Columbia
|Joseph G. "Scottie" Morrison
|11
|54 feet
|style="text-align:left"|Operated on Atlin Lake.  Originally owned by Morrison.  Sold to Margaret Ward in 1902. Resold to the Northern Lumber Co. in 1904. Blown ashore in 1906.

|- style="vertical-align:top; text-align:center"
|style="text-align:left"|Comet|None
|1899
|Shakan, Alaska
|
|4
|
|style="text-align:left"|Eventually owned by Capt. Norron.  Existed in 1902.

|- style="vertical-align:top; text-align:center"
|style="text-align:left"|Concord|U.S.A. #127306
|1898
|St. Michael, Alaska
|
|11
|46 feet
|style="text-align:left"|Owned by Henry C. Lassen.  May have been at Koyukuk River, Alaska during winter of 1898–1899.  Registry closed in 1903 or 1904.

|- style="vertical-align:top; text-align:center"
|style="text-align:left"|Dawson City|......
|......
|......
|......
|......
|......
|style="text-align:left"|See, Gussie Brown.

|- style="vertical-align:top; text-align:center"
|style="text-align:left"|Eclipse|None
|1898
|St. Michael, Alaska
|Gloucester Mining Co.
|35
|50 feet
|style="text-align:left"|Owned by the GM Co.  At Union City, Alaska on the Koyukuk River during the winter of 1898–1899.  Wrecked by ice at Nulato, Alaska in 1899.

|- style="vertical-align:top; text-align:center"
|style="text-align:left"|El Sueno|U.S.A. #136625
|1894
|Alameda, California
|Joseph A. Leonard
|23
|44 feet
|style="text-align:left"|Originally a sloop, owned by Joseph A. Leonard.  Sold to El Sueño de Oro Mining & Transportation Co. (of San Francisco, California) in 1897.  Converted to a steam power-screw propeller in 1898.  At Dall River, Alaska during winter of 1898–1899."Articles of Incorporation," 93 Sacramento Record-Union, No. 176 (August 17, 1897), at page 6, Col. 2; "Alaska Yukon and Klondike Goldfields" (advertisement), 82 San Francisco Call, No. 76 (August 15, 1897), at page 2, Col. 6.  Sold to Victor W. Kloppenberg & Lord in 1899.  Foundered off Nome, Alaska, in 1903.
- Sueño is the Spanish word for dream.  El sueño de oro means the dream of gold.

|- style="vertical-align:top; text-align:center"
|style="text-align:left"|Empire|U.S.A. #136674
|1898
|Elizabeth, New Jersey
|Crescent Shipyard
(hull #56)
|115
|85 feet
|style="text-align:left"|First tunnel boat to operate on the Yukon River.  Originally owned by Empire Transportation Co.  Transferred to the Northern Navigation Co. in 1901.  Registry closed in 1907 or 1908.

|- style="vertical-align:top; text-align:center"
|style="text-align:left"|Gertrude|U.S.A. #86423
|1898
|New Whatcom, Washington
|A. L. Walsh
|17
|39 feet
|style="text-align:left"|Originally owned by Little Rhody-Alaska Mining & Transportation Co.  Abandoned in 1922 or 1923.

|- style="vertical-align:top; text-align:center"
|style="text-align:left"|Gladys|Canada #107722
|1899
|Jersey City, New Jersey
|Marine Vapor Engine Co.
|9
|45 feet
|style="text-align:left"|External combustion, but originally used alcohol vapor instead of steam as the working fluid.  Originally owned by the North-West Mounted Police.  The NWMP became the Royal Northwest Mounted Police in 1904.  Boat converted to steam power in 1906.  Sold to Pine Creek Power Co. in 1910.  Sold to the Inland Trading Co. in 1914.  Abandoned at Atlin, British Columbia in 1930.  Remains still at Atlin.
- Named for Jean Gladys Perry (1887–1972), daughter of Aylesworth Bowen Perry, commander of the NWMP in the Yukon from 1899 to 1900 (Reg. #O.44).

|- style="vertical-align:top; text-align:center"
|style="text-align:left"|Gold Hunter|None
|1898
|Alameda, California
|
|4
|
|style="text-align:left"|At Koyukuk River, Alaska during winter of 1898–1899.  Last inspected in 1904.

|- style="vertical-align:top; text-align:center"
|style="text-align:left"|Gov. Stoneman
|U.S.A. #86081
|1885
|Sacramento, California
|
|15
|44 feet
|style="text-align:left"|Originally owned by California State Fish Commission.  Out of commission from 1892 or 1893 until 1897 (including about 6 months at the bottom of the Sacramento River).  Sold to M. Nixon Kimball and L. Stuart Upson in 1897.  Wrecked in a storm near Nome, Alaska in 1900.

|- style="vertical-align:top; text-align:center"
|style="text-align:left"|Gussie Brown(Dawson City, 1898–1903)
|U.S.A. #157508
|1898
|San Francisco, California
|Stone & Wilson
|119
|83 feet
|style="text-align:left"|Originally owned by the Alaska Mining & Transportation Co.  Sold to Joseph Gawley by 1925.  Abandoned in 1926 or 1927.

|- style="vertical-align:top; text-align:center"
|style="text-align:left"|1st Herbert|None
|1898
|St. Michael, Alaska
|
|5
|
|style="text-align:left"|Operated on the Lower Yukon River.  Owned by George M. Pilcher.  Last inspected in 1902.  Listed in Jones (1904).
- Named for Herbert H. Pilcher (1863–1934), older brother of George M.

|- style="vertical-align:top; text-align:center"
|style="text-align:left"|2nd Herbert|U.S.A. #203375
|1906
|Anvik, Alaska
|
|12
|30 feet
|style="text-align:left"|Owned by George M. Pilcher.  Registry closed in 1919 or 1920.
- Named for Herbert H. Pilcher (1863–1934), older brother of George M.

|- style="vertical-align:top; text-align:center"
|style="text-align:left"|Hettie B|U.S.A. #96278
|1894
|San Francisco, California
|
|27
|43 feet
|style="text-align:left"|Originally a sloop with an auxiliary gasoline engine and screw propeller, and owned by John A. McNear.  Sold to Alaska-Yukon Transportation Co. in 1897.  Converted to steam power-screw propeller in 1898.  May have been at Koyukuk River, Alaska during winter of 1898–1899.  Converted back to gasoline power in 1902.  Eventually owned by George D. Schofield.  Stranded at Safety Lagoon, Alaska in 1919.

|- style="vertical-align:top; text-align:center"
|style="text-align:left"|Jessie|Canada #107721
|1899
|Jersey City, New Jersey
|Marine Vapor Engine Co.
|9
|45 feet
|style="text-align:left"|External combustion, but used alcohol vapor instead of steam as the working fluid.  Originally owned by the North-West Mounted Police.  The NWMP became the Royal Northwest Mounted Police in 1904.  Boat sold to A. J. W. Bridgeman and R. Greenwood in 1908.  Registry closed in 1920.
- Named for Jessie E. Perry (1886–1974), daughter of Aylesworth Bowen Perry, commander of the NWMP in the Yukon from 1899 to 1900 (Reg. #O.44).

|- style="vertical-align:top; text-align:center"
|style="text-align:left"|Joe Mathews|U.S.A. #77286
|1898
|Everett, Washington
|Cascade Development Co.
|46
|46 feet
|style="text-align:left"|Owned by Cascade Development Co.  At Arctic City, Alaska on the Koyukuk River during the winter of 1898–1899.  Stranded at Cape Nome, Alaska in 1899.  In 1906, hull rebuilt, reduced from 46 to 19 gross tons, and converted to gasoline power.  Eventually owned by J. Myron Haley.  Stranded at Cape Darby, Alaska in 1910.
- Named for Joseph R. "Joe" Mathews (1865–1935), Alaska steamboat pilot.

|- style="vertical-align:top; text-align:center"
|style="text-align:left"|Little Jim|None
|1898
|Carcross, Yukon
|Iowa-Alaska Mining Co.
|
|
|style="text-align:left"|Owned by the IAM Co.  At Koyukuk River, Alaska during winter of 1898–1899.

|- style="vertical-align:top; text-align:center"
|style="text-align:left"|Mabel F|Canada #107259
|1898
|Bennett, British Columbia
|C. Kersting
|10
|40 feet
|style="text-align:left"|Originally owned by John M. Flower. Sold to Edward W. G. "Ted" Tennant in 1902. Resold to P. H. Johnson by 1906.  Resold to Matthew Watson in 1918 or 1919. Resold to John Williams in 1924. Registry closed in 1948.  Scuttled in Nares Lake, Yukon in 1950.

|- style="vertical-align:top; text-align:center"
|style="text-align:left"|Mariam|None
|1897
|Seattle, Washington
|
|[launch] 
|
|style="text-align:left"|Owned by North American Transportation & Trading Co.  Foundered near Stuart Island, Alaska in 1899.

|- style="vertical-align:top; text-align:center"
|style="text-align:left"|Marie Balmer|U.S.A. #208035
|1910
|St. Michael, Alaska
|
|9
|54 feet
|style="text-align:left"|Originally gasoline power-screw propeller.  Owned by Edwin H. Flynn.  Converted to steam power in 1913 or 1914.  Abandoned in 1922 or 1923.

|- style="vertical-align:top; text-align:center"
|style="text-align:left"|Rebecca|None
|1898
|Brooklyn, New York
|U.S. Navy Yard, New York
|7
|
|style="text-align:left"|Owned by U.S. Government.  Operated on the Lower Yukon River beginning in 1898.  Last inspected in 1907.

|- style="vertical-align:top; text-align:center"
|style="text-align:left"|Sirene|None
|1894
|Nyack, New York
|
|4
|
|style="text-align:left"|At Koyukuk River, Alaska during winter of 1898–1899.  For sale in 1899.  Last inspected in 1900.  Listed in Jones (1904).

|- style="vertical-align:top; text-align:center"
|style="text-align:left"|Tagish|None
|1899
|Jersey City, New Jersey
|Marine Vapor Engine Co.
|
|28 feet
|style="text-align:left"|External combustion, but used alcohol vapor instead of steam as the working fluid.  Originally owned by the North-West Mounted Police.  The NWMP became the Royal Northwest Mounted Police in 1904.  Boat sold to the British Columbia Government in 1908.
- Tagish was derived from the Tagish phrase taa-gish, which means breakup of ice.<ref name=tagish>See, Entry No. 54 (Tagish Narrows = Taagish Tóo'e [breakup [of ice, e.g.] - water]).  The prefix de- or taa- [it]; tu or tóo [water].  Figueiredo, Renato B. (ed., 2014). Freelang Tagish Online Dictionary.  Gish may have been a loanword from Tlingit.  The Tlingit verb root geesh is an idiom, which figuratively means to get wet, and literally means to be like kelp.  See,   Broken up spring ice does get wet.  The suffix -e may be the Tagish possession suffix.</ref>  This name refers to the sound that the Tagish River ice makes during spring breakup.  The Tagish Indians adopted this name to identify themselves because, prior to 1898, they spent their winters along the Tagish River.

|- style="vertical-align:top; text-align:center"
|style="text-align:left"|Wm. McKinley
|None
|1898
|St. Michael, Alaska
|
|5
|
|style="text-align:left"|At Koyukuk River, Alaska during winter of 1898–1899.  Wrecked in a storm at St. Michael in 1899.

|- style="vertical-align:top; text-align:center"
|style="text-align:left"|Wm. Ogilvie
|Canada #107527
|1899
|Bennett, British Columbia
|James B. Colvin
|82
|63 feet
|style="text-align:left"|Originally owned by Teslin Yukon Steam Navigation Co. Sold to Harry E. Brown in 1912. Resold to the Inland Trading Co. in 1913. Abandoned at Taku City, British Columbia in 1938.

|- style="vertical-align:top; text-align:center"
|style="text-align:left"|Winthrop|None
|1898
|St. Michael, Alaska
|
|7
|
|style="text-align:left"|At Koyukuk River, Alaska during winter of 1898–1899.  For sale in 1899.  Last inspected in 1900.  Listed in Jones (1904).

|- style="vertical-align:top; text-align:center"
|style="text-align:left"|Witch Hazel|None
|1894
|Bridal Veil, Oregon
|
|
|27 feet
|style="text-align:left"|Owned by Frank D. Atkins and Edward L. Bushnell.  Operated on the Upper Yukon River in 1894 and 1895.  Abandoned near Hootalinqua in 1895.  Revived and travelled downriver in 1898.  Hull last reported to be at Ft. Cudahy, Yukon.
- Witch Hazel, Oregon was (and is) a small community about 44 miles from Bridal Veil, and near the home of a person named Frank Atkins.  The witch hazel plant is not native to Oregon.

|- style="vertical-align:top; text-align:center"
|style="text-align:left"|Wyvern|Canada #107160
|1898
|Dartmouth, United Kingdom
|
|8
|45 feet
|style="text-align:left"|Owned by Edward M. Bruce. Wrecked on the Snake River, Yukon in 1900.

|- style="vertical-align:top; text-align:center"
|style="text-align:left"|Yellow Kid
|Canada #107258
|1898
|Lindeman, British Columbia
|
|3
|29 feet
|style="text-align:left"|Owned by F. Porter Worsnop.  Wrecked and abandoned in 1920.

|- style="vertical-align:top; text-align:center"
|style="text-align:left"|Yukon
|U.S.A. #27578
|1869
|San Francisco, California
|John W. Gates
|20
|49 feet
|style="text-align:left"|Originally owned by Parrott & Co. Parrott & Co. was absorbed by the Alaska Commercial Co. in 1870. Wrecked by ice at Ft. Yukon, Alaska in 1880.
- For remarks relating to the name Yukon, see, Remarks for 2nd Yukon, U.S.A. #165172, under White Pass and Yukon Route, above.
|}

References

General references

Technical and ownership information of the above boats was derived from the following:

 
 
 
 Alaska Railroad Record, Vols. 1-4 (weekly, 1916–1920).
 
 Andrews, Clarence L. (1916). "Marine Disasters in Alaska of the Alaska Route," 7 The Washington Historical Quarterly, No. 1 (Jan. 1, 1916), at pp. 21–37.
 
 
 
 Bayers, Lloyd H.  Capt. Lloyd H. "Kinky" Bayers Collection, General Marine Files, MS 0010, Alaska State Library, Juneau, Alaska.
 
 
 California Digital Newspaper Collection, Center for Bibliographic Studies and Research, University of California, Riverside.
 Colton, Tim.  Shipbuilding History, at, http://www.shipbuildinghistory.com .
 
 
 
 
 
 
 
 , various years.
 , various years.
 , various years.
 Miramar Ship Index, (http://www.miramarshipindex.org.nz/, July 18, 2009).
 
 
 
 Progress Reports of the Alaskan Engineering Commission, 1916–1923.  Record Group 126, National Archives and Records Administration, College Park, Maryland.
 
   Yukon Archives, Whitehorse, Yukon.
 Sundry Civil Appropriations Bill for 1919: Hearings before Subcommittee of House Committee on Appropriations, 65th Cong., 2nd Sess. 1156 (1918) (Alaskan Engineering Commission).
   Yukon Archives, Whitehorse, Yukon.
 
 
 
   University of Missouri-St. Louis Mercantile Library, St. Louis, Missouri.
 White Pass and Yukon Route Comptroller's Special Report'', for years 1902–1949 (privately held)
 

Yukon